In number theory, the Fermat–Catalan conjecture is a generalization of Fermat's Last Theorem and of Catalan's conjecture, hence the name. The conjecture states that the equation

has only finitely many solutions (a,b,c,m,n,k) with distinct triplets of values (am, bn, ck) where a, b, c are positive coprime integers and m, n, k are positive integers satisfying

The inequality on m, n, and k is a necessary part of the conjecture. Without the inequality there would be infinitely many solutions, for instance with k = 1 (for any a, b, m, and n and with c = am + bn) or with m, n, and k all equal to two (for the infinitely many known Pythagorean triples).

Known solutions
As of 2015, the following ten solutions to equation (1) which meet the criteria of equation (2) are known: 

The first of these (1m + 23 = 32) is the only solution where one of a, b or c is 1, according to the Catalan conjecture, proven in 2002 by Preda Mihăilescu. While this case leads to infinitely many solutions of (1) (since one can pick any m for m > 6), these solutions only give a single triplet of values (am, bn, ck).

Partial results
It is known by the Darmon–Granville theorem, which uses Faltings's theorem, that for any fixed choice of positive integers m, n and k satisfying (2), only finitely many coprime triples (a, b, c) solving (1) exist. However,  the full Fermat–Catalan conjecture is stronger as it allows for the exponents m, n and k to vary.

The abc conjecture implies the Fermat–Catalan conjecture.

For a list of results for impossible combinations of exponents, see Beal conjecture#Partial results. Beal's conjecture is true if and only if all Fermat–Catalan solutions have m = 2, n = 2, or k = 2.

See also

Sums of powers, a list of related conjectures and theorems

References

External links

 Perfect Powers: Pillai's works and their developments. Waldschmidt,  M. 

Conjectures
Unsolved problems in number theory
Diophantine equations